Back 4 Blood is a 2021 first-person shooter game developed by Turtle Rock Studios and published by Warner Bros. Games. It was released on October 12, 2021, for PlayStation 4, PlayStation 5, Windows, Xbox One, and Xbox Series X/S.

The game is considered to be a spiritual successor to the Left 4 Dead series, and carries over several key gameplay pillars, such as a strong emphasis on cooperative teamwork, and an AI system called the "Game Director", which dynamically modifies the environment, placement of enemies, items, and obstacles in response to players' progression and behavior.

Gameplay  
In the game's primary player versus environment game modes, players join a four-person team of post-apocalypse survivors called Cleaners, who must fight their way through levels populated by zombie-like monsters called The Ridden. Teammates are either controlled by other players or AI bots depending on matchmaking preferences and player availability. A new feature of Back 4 Blood is cards. At the start of each level, players need to build their deck with cards that adjust various elements of gameplay, such as modifying the player's health, damage, and stamina. Along with player cards, the AI Director will also use Corruption cards against the player to hinder their progress. The AI can spawn extra enemies, activate a fog effect, and increase the size of the horde. The game features pre-defined hero characters who have preset attributes and abilities, and players can purchase upgrades and items with an in-game currency called Copper.

The game has an eight-person player versus player mode called Swarm, where a team of four players assumes the role of Cleaners, and the other team of four control mutated Ridden. The teams are tasked with eliminating one another within a closed area.

Plot

Overview 
A parasite called "the Devil Worm" (implied to be of extraterrestrial origin) infects most of humanity, turning them into vicious undead mutants called the "Ridden". One year after the beginning of the outbreak, pockets of humanity attempt to survive in the post-apocalyptic world. A group of veteran survivors called the "Cleaners" fight the Ridden and defend Fort Hope, a settlement within fictional Finleyville, Pennsylvania, United States.

In the primary game modes, the player can control one of 12 Cleaners: Walker, an Army Ranger veteran and de facto leader of the Cleaners; Chris, the eldest Cleaner nicknamed "Mom" because of her maternal attitude; Holly, a brash fighter who wields a baseball bat named Dotty; Evangelo, an optimistic recruit; Hoffman, a socially awkward survivalist, and conspiracy theorist; Seo-yeon, who is nicknamed "Doc" for being the group's medic and scientific expert; Jim, an experienced hunter, and marksman, Karlee, a cynical lone wolf, Heng, a survivalist and chef at heart, Sharice, a tough as nails former firefighter, "Prophet" Dan, a protector for "the light's chosen", and the newest cleaner, Tala, a former cult member of the children of the worm.

Each character has unique perks and attributes which can favor certain strategies and roles within a four-person team. For example, Doc can restore more health when healing herself or other players, and gives the team a passive bonus against damage, while Karlee automatically highlights mutants in her immediate proximity, and can use or activate environmental features faster.

During a mission, characters in a party will comment on their immediate situation and banter with one another, revealing insights into their backstory and personality.

Story 
The game's campaign begins with Walker, "Mom", Evangelo, and Holly, arriving at a settlement in Evansburgh to trade supplies. A horde of mutated Ridden suddenly swarm and overrun Evansburgh. As the team retreats to Fort Hope, their commander, General Phillips, has them demolish the Washington Crossing Bridge to delay the Riddens' advance.

At Fort Hope, the team finds more Ridden attacking their stronghold and overrunning the town outside its walls. With the help of Hoffman, Karlee, Doc, and Jim, they successfully defend the fort and rescue survivors. The Cleaners are sent to a mine where the Ridden hordes have been emerging from. After sealing the mine, the Cleaners raid a police station and a crashed military cargo plane to secure more armaments.

Phillips sends the Cleaners to another location to extract Doctor Rogers, a scientist who has developed a chemical weapon called T-5 that is significantly effective against the Ridden. After successfully extracting Rogers and his research materials, the Cleaners travel to an abandoned research and quarantine center to collect materials to produce T-5. There, the Cleaners discover a mass grave, which has become a breeding ground for the Ridden and their new mutant variants.

After securing the T-5 compounds, the Cleaners fly back to Fort Hope in a Black Hawk helicopter piloted by Rogers, and see Fort Hope being attacked by a massive burrowing Ridden called "the Abomination". The Cleaners weaken the Abomination with a T-5 payload before their helicopter crashes, killing Rogers. On the ground, the Cleaners neutralize the Abomination together. With Fort Hope saved, Walker rallies the Cleaners to hunt down more Abominations and turn the tide against the Ridden.

During this time, the Cleaners Heng and Sharice join the team due to the surge of "Ridden Hives" which are popping up across Evansburgh and Finleyville. The team venture down into these Hives to clean them out of ridden, see proof of other groups who are brave enough to venture down into the hives and collect "Skull Totems" to trade with a mysterious group known as "The Collectors".

Development 
The game was developed by Turtle Rock Studios, including seven of the developers who worked on the demo that would become the first Left 4 Dead game. According to the development team, the game features a more expanded story than the Left 4 Dead games, and has a more uplifting tone than other zombie games in the market. Phil Robb, the game's creative director, added that the Cleaners are more confident and capable, unlike the everymen from Left 4 Dead. He added that the players are not merely surviving and finding safe places. They are fighting zombies to create safe spaces. This is reflected in the dialogue between the Cleaners, who no longer sound like they were afraid of their enemies. The team included the card systems in the game because they felt that it can keep the game dynamic and challenging for veteran players, though Turtle Rock also added a Classic mode, a more accessible experience that removes all the cards, for new players.

The game was announced in March 2019 by Turtle Rock and publisher Warner Bros. Games. The game was unveiled during The Game Awards 2020, with the closed alpha releasing December 17, 2020. Initially set to be released on June 22, 2021, the game was delayed to October 12, 2021 for PlayStation 4, PlayStation 5, Windows, Xbox One, and Xbox Series X/S. An open beta was released in mid-August 2021. The first phase began with an early access from August 5 to August 9 for players who have pre-ordered the game. The second phase began and was available for all players from August 12 to August 16.

In January 2022, Turtle Rock Studios confirmed in a Reddit Ask me Anything plans for future paid downloadable content, to which new characters will be tied to. The first expansion, titled "Tunnels of Terror", was released on April 12, 2022. The expansion introduces two new playable characters and a player-versus-environment activity named Ridden Hives. The second expansion, titled "Children of the Worm", was released on August 30, 2022. This expansion introduces a new playable cleaner named "Prophet" Dan, a new act for the player-versus-environment campaign mode and four new enemies. On December 6th, 2022, the third and final expansion, "River of Blood" was released. In January 2023, Turtle Rock announced that they had shifted their development resources to their next project and no more content update would be released for this game.

Reception 

Back 4 Blood received "generally favorable" reviews for the PC and PlayStation 5 versions but  "mixed or average" reviews for the Xbox Series X/S version, according to review aggregator Metacritic.

Neil Bolt, writing for horror magazine Bloody Disgusting, said that "the game still often plods along casually for periods before unleashing far too much confusion and chaos at once", adding that "given the game this is trying to build upon, seemingly random encounters make sense, but there needs to be a level of puppeteering behind the scenes to ensure it is not a mess in play", with he concludes that the game is  "almost unpleasant to play at times" but that it was a "decent" game. Polygon cited it as the 47th best game of 2021.

As of October 26, 2021, the game has had over 6 million players since its launch. By February 2022, more than 10 million players have played the game. Warner Bros. declared the game as one of the fastest-selling original intellectual properties released for consoles in 2021.

Accolades 
The game was nominated at the Golden Joystick Awards 2021 for the "Best Multiplayer" category. The game was also nominated at The Game Awards 2021 for "Best Action Game" and "Best Multiplayer Game." It was also nominated for "Online Game of the Year" at the 25th Annual D.I.C.E. Awards.

References

External links 
 

2021 video games
Asymmetrical multiplayer video games
Cooperative video games
First-person shooters
Multiplayer and single-player video games
PlayStation 4 games
PlayStation 4 Pro enhanced games
PlayStation 5 games
Post-apocalyptic video games
Unreal Engine games
Video games about viral outbreaks
Video games about zombies
 Video games developed in the United States
 Video games featuring female protagonists
 Video games set in Pennsylvania
Warner Bros. video games
 Windows games
 Xbox Cloud Gaming games
 Xbox One games
 Xbox One X enhanced games
 Xbox Series X and Series S games
Video games featuring black protagonists